De tal palo tal astilla (English translation: A Chip Off the Old Block) is a 1960 Mexican western comedy film directed by Miguel M. Delgado, produced by Jesús Galindo, and released by Filmadora Chapultepec. It stars Luis Aguilar, Eulalio González, Flor Silvestre, and Marina Camacho in the main roles.

The film's story was written by José María Fernández Unsáin, based on an original idea from Eulalio González, one of the film's actors. Alfredo Varela, Jr. and Miguel M. Delgado wrote the adapted and technical screenplays, respectively.

Cast
Luis Aguilar as Miguel Marmolejo
Eulalio González as Gumaro Malacara (as Lalo Gonzalez 'Piporro')
Flor Silvestre as Elena
Marina Camacho as Rosa
León Barroso as Sóstenes Morales
José Jasso as Cantinero
Roberto Meyer as Juez de Registro Civil
Armando Gutiérrez as Notario
José Chávez as Chalío (credited as Jose T. Chavez)
Francisco Meneses		
Carlos Guarneros as Mensajero de Chalío
Aurelio Salinas		
Lupe Carriles as Doña Eulalia

Production
Principal photography began on June 1, 1959, in Estudios Churubusco.

Release
De tal palo tal astilla premiered at the Orfeón theater in Mexico City on October 20, 1960 during one week.

References

External links

Films directed by Miguel M. Delgado